Kirton or Kirton in Holland is an English village and civil parish in the Borough of Boston, Lincolnshire. The population of the civil parish at the 2011 census was 5,371.

History

The Domesday Book of 1086 terms the village Cherchetune. In 1066 lordship of the manor was held by Earl Ralph. It had passed to Count Alan of Brittany by 1086.

Before the local-government changes of the late 20th century, the parish came under Boston Rural District in the Parts of Holland – one of three divisions or parts of the historic county of Lincolnshire, which the Local Government Act of 1888 made a county in itself in most respects.

The 1885 Kelly's Directory recorded a Kirton railway station on the Great Northern Railway line between Boston and Spalding line. The station closed in 1961.

There existed in the 19th century Congregational and Wesleyan chapels and almshouses for four poor women. The village market was disused. A Gas Consumers' Company Ltd formed in 1865. The main landowners were the Mercers' Company, Sir Thomas Whichcote DL, E. R. C. Cust DL, the Very Rev. Arthur Percival Purey-Cust DD, and Samuel Smeeton, whose residence was the "modern white building" of D'Eyncourt Hall. The crops grown in the  parish were wheat, beans and potatoes. The 1881 the ecclesiastical parish population was 2,011, that of the civil parish, 2,580. Kirton in Holland Town Hall was opened in August 1912.

Church
The parish church is dedicated to St Peter and St Paul. The transepts had double aisles like those of Algarkirk and Spalding, but, in 1804, the central tower and transepts were pulled down and the chancel shortened, the architect (Hayward) using gunpowder to remove the tower. This was completed by 1809. In 1900 a restoration of the rebuilt church was undertaken by the architect Hodgson Fowler.

Grammar school
In 1624, Thomas (later Sir Thomas) Middlecott was empowered by a Private Act of Parliament to found a Free Grammar School for teaching the Latin and Greek languages and providing English commercial and agricultural education to children from the parishes of Kirton, Sutterton, Algarkirk and Fosdyke. By 1835, the school had 40 pupils, some attending free and some paying fees. The Master (headmaster) appointed in 1773, Rev. Charles Wildbore (c. 1736–1802), and later his son by the same name (1767–1842), were later accused of diverting surplus income from the school's endowments for their own use and failing to keep up educational standards. This culminated in a parliamentary report, and ultimately a restructuring of the school management in 1851. By 1885, William Cochran was Master and a new school house had been built next to his house. Under a scheme of the Endowed School Act, amended in 1898, the school ranked as a "second-grade" Grammar School.

In the 1830s the village gained a girls' school for 14 day and boarding pupils and  a Sunday School for 32 boys and 16 girls.

The village now has a secondary modern school: Thomas Middlecott Academy.

The Old King's Head
The Old King's Head is a former public house listed as a Grade II historic building. The earlier part of it was built at the end of the 16th century. It underwent major alterations in 1661 in Artisan Mannerist Style. It is red brick in English bond, with recent tiles on a former thatched roof. It became a domestic residence in the 1960s, but had fallen into disrepair and was purchased in 2016 by Heritage Lincolnshire, which has assigned over £2 million for its restoration.

Geography
Kirton is on the main A16, B1397 and B1192 roads south of Boston, near Frampton and Sutterton. Several satellite villages and hamlets take their name from Kirton, including Kirton Holme, Kirton End, Kirton Fen, Kirton Skeldyke, and Kirton Marsh. Until 1970, the village had Kirton railway station on a line from Boston now closed.

Kirton Meres

The parish contained the ancient manor of Kirton Meres, the seat of Roger de Kirton (d. 1383), alias de Kirketon / Roger de Meres / Meeres), a Justice of the Common Pleas (1371–1380). The manor house (later known as "Orme Hall") was demolished in 1818 but the arched gatehouse (Porter's Lodge, built of brick, guard room,  and chambers  over it, with stone dressings, windows, archway, door-ways, and copings, surmounted by highly pitched step gables, with 15 sculpted heraldic shields, some now held by the Spalding Gentlemen's Society, Broad Street, Spalding, Lincs) survived until 1925 on the south side of the Willington Road, one mile west of the village of Kirton. Another of this family resident at Kirton Meres was the churchman Francis Meres (1565-1647).<ref>Kirton, Jonathan  G., The Ruin at Kirton, 2013 Article by Colonel C. T. J. Moore, "Lincolnshire Notes and Queries", Vol. III, (1893), Item 140, on pp. 243 and 244; "Notes and Queries", 8th Series, Volume XII, July to December 1897, p. 47, 17 July 1897; "Oxford Journals", "Notes and Queries", 9th Series, Volume IV, July to December, 1899, p. 229 (dated 16 September 1899)</ref>

Local governance
Local governance of the village was reorganised on 1 April 1974, as a result of the Local Government Act 1972. Kirton parish forms its own electoral ward.

Kirton falls within the drainage area of the Black Sluice Internal Drainage Board.

Research centre
The former Kirton Research Centre was nearby. Ownership of the  centre for horticultural research was transferred from the Department for Environment, Food and Rural Affairs to the University of Warwick in April 2004 and it became part of Horticulture Research International. In August 2009 the University closed it, as public and private funding fell £2 million short of covering its annual running costs.

Notable people
In order of birth:
Francis Meres (1565/1566 – 1647), churchman and author
Joseph Gilbert (1732 – 1821), born in Kirton, was Master of HMS Resolution on Cook's second voyage.
Dame Sarah Swift (1854 – 1937), born in Kirton Skeldyke, set up the Royal College of Nursing.
Harold Jackson VC (31 May 1892 – 24 August 1918), a sergeant in The East Yorkshire Regiment who received the Victoria Cross in 1917 and was killed a year later, came from Allandale, Kirton.
Oliver "Ollie" Ryan (born 1985), footballer, attended Kirton Primary School.

See alsoAttorney General v Davy'' (1741) 26 ER 531, a leading legal case in UK company law

References

External links

Parish council
Kirton News
Kirton Brass Band
 Sea Scouts
Kirton Primary School
Middlecott School
Kirton Town Hall.

Media
 Horticultural research station to close in 2009

 
Villages in Lincolnshire
Civil parishes in Lincolnshire
Borough of Boston